The Terebellidae is a marine family of polychaete worms, of which the type taxon is Terebella, described by Carl Linnaeus in his 1767 12th edition of Systema Naturae.

Characteristics 
Most terebellids live in burrows or crevices and are often of large size, ranging up to 150 millimetres in length and 15 millimetres in width. The numerous, very long tentacles which radiate from near the mouth are used for finding and collecting food particles from the sediment surface. The tentacles are not retractable as is the case in the ampharetids. They have plump anterior bodies and numerous segments in their long, tapered posterior bodies, whereas ampharetids are more compact. They have branched gills laterally on up to three anterior chaetigers but in the subfamily Thelepodinae the gills are numerous simple filaments. The mid-body chaetigers are in double rows in the subfamily Terebellinae. In the subfamily Polycirrinae, the gills are absent and the prostomium is expanded as an undulating membrane which bears the tentacles.,

Systematics
The roughly 400 known species are divided between many dozens of genera. Most of these are assigned to 4 subfamilies. Some additional genera are of unresolved or quite basal position.

Gallery

References

Three new species of Thelepus Leuckart, 1849 from Europe and a re-description of T. cincinnatus (Fabricius, 1780)

External links

Terebellida